Judo at the 2002 Commonwealth Games was the third time that Judo at the Commonwealth Games was included as a sport. It had been held as a demonstration sport at the 1986 Commonwealth Games and made its official debut at the 1990 Commonwealth Games. The sport took place in the GMEX.

Results

References

2002 Commonwealth Games events
2002 in judo
2002
Judo in England
Judo competitions in the United Kingdom